Claremont Hotel may refer to:

 Claremont Hotel & Spa, in Oakland, California and Berkeley, California
 Claremont Hotel (Southwest Harbor, Maine), listed on the NRHP in Maine
Claremont Hotel (Eastbourne), UK

See also
 Clairemont (disambiguation)
 Clairmont (disambiguation)
 Claremont (disambiguation)
 Clermont (disambiguation)